William H. Barnes (April 13, 1858 – July 10, 1945) was a baseball player, playing as a center fielder in the 19th century. He played for the St. Paul Saints of the Union Association, a replacement team which began play near the end of the 1884 season.  He was a native of Indianapolis, Indiana.
  
In 8 games as the Saints' starting center fielder Barnes batted .200 (6-for-30) with two runs scored. In the field he recorded eight putouts, three errors, and participated in one double play.

External links
Baseball Reference
Retrosheet
MiLB.com

19th-century baseball players
Major League Baseball center fielders
Baseball players from Minnesota
People from Shakopee, Minnesota
St. Paul Saints (UA) players
1945 deaths
1858 births
St. Paul Apostles players
Duluth Freezers players